Tertyshny, feminine: Tertyshnaya is a Russian-language surname. Notable people with the surname include:

 Alexei Tertyshny (born 1977), Russian ice hockey player and coach
 Dmitri Tertyshny (1976–1999), Russian ice hockey player
 Sergey Tertyshny (born 1970), Russian ice hockey player

Russian-language surnames